José Gerson Ramos or simply Gérson (born March 29, 1981 in Carmópolis),  is a Brazilian attacking midfielder for Atlético Sorocaba.

Contract
Atlético Mineiro (Loan) 25 July 2007 to 1 July 2008
Paraná 16 April 2006 to 16 April 2009

External links
 sambafoot
 CBF
 zerozero.pt
 placar
 atletico.com.br

1981 births
Living people
Brazilian footballers
Paraná Clube players
Clube Atlético Mineiro players
Mogi Mirim Esporte Clube players
Associação Atlética Ponte Preta players
Desportivo Brasil players
Association football midfielders